Uriel Da Veiga (born August 28, 1940) is a retired Brazilian football (soccer) player who played professionally in the North American Soccer League and National Professional Soccer League.

In 1967, Da Viega signed with the Baltimore Bays of the National Professional Soccer League.  In 1969, the NPSL merged with the United Soccer Association to form the North American Soccer League.  Da Viega and his team mates spent the 1968 season in the NASL.  In 1970, he joined the Atlanta Chiefs and remained with the team through the 1973 season.  That last season, the team was known as the Atlanta Apollos after the team was renamed by new ownership.

References
 NASL stats

1940 births
Living people
Atlanta Chiefs players
Baltimore Bays players
Brazilian footballers
Brazilian expatriate footballers
National Professional Soccer League (1967) players
North American Soccer League (1968–1984) players
Expatriate soccer players in the United States
Brazilian expatriate sportspeople in the United States
Association football defenders
Sportspeople from Niterói